The 2000 Temple Owls football team represented Temple University in the college 2000 NCAA Division I-A football season. The Owls competed as a member of the Big East Conference, and the team was coached by Bobby Wallace.

Schedule

References

Temple
Temple Owls football seasons
Temple Owls football